Sweet Home is a census-designated place (CDP) in Pulaski County, Arkansas, United States. Its population was 849 at the 2010 census. It is part of the 'Little Rock-North Little Rock-AR Metropolitan Statistical Area'.

Geography
Sweet Home is located at  (34.681478, -92.243445).

Demographics

2020 census

As of the 2020 United States census, there were 712 people, 259 households, and 125 families residing in the CDP.

2000 census
As of the census of 2000, there were 1,070 people, 385 households, and 267 families residing in the CDP. The racial makeup of the CDP was 24.11% White, 74.02% Black or African American, 0.37% Native American, 0.09% Asian, and 1.40% from two or more races.  1.12% of the population were Hispanic or Latino of any race.

There were 385 households, out of which 29.9% had children under the age of 18 living with them, 38.4% were married couples living together, 23.9% had a female householder with no husband present, and 30.4% were non-families. 27.8% of all households were made up of individuals, and 11.2% had someone living alone who was 65 years of age or older.  The average household size was 2.78 and the average family size was 3.42.

In the CDP, the population was spread out, with 30.7% under the age of 18, 8.5% from 18 to 24, 25.2% from 25 to 44, 23.0% from 45 to 64, and 12.6% who were 65 years of age or older.  The median age was 35 years. For every 100 females, there were 87.7 males.  For every 100 females age 18 and over, there were 81.0 males.

The median income for a household in the CDP was $23,352, and the median income for a family was $30,781. Males had a median income of $22,069 versus $21,643 for females. The per capita income for the CDP was $8,868.  About 21.7% of families and 25.5% of the population were below the poverty line, including 23.3% of those under age 18 and 60.0% of those age 65 or over.

History
Most of the geographical history of Sweet Home and the surrounding areas was farms and fields. After bauxite mining between the 1940s through 1960s many blue holes were formed in the Sweet Home Area.

Sweet Home was the site of the Arkansas Confederate Soldiers' Home from 1890 to 1955, but the home was moved to the grounds of the Schools for the Deaf and Blind in Little Rock from 1955 to 1963. The Hanger Cotton Gin is listed on the National Register of Historic Places.

Education

Sweet Home is zoned to College Station Elementary School, Fuller Middle School, and Wilbur D. Mills University Studies High School.

Personalities
Writer and poet Henry Dumas (1934-1968)

References

Encyclopedia of Arkansas History & Culture

Census-designated places in Arkansas
Census-designated places in Pulaski County, Arkansas
Census-designated places in Little Rock–North Little Rock–Conway metropolitan area